Romina Francesca Power (born October 2, 1951) is an American actress and singer born in Los Angeles, California. She is the daughter of Hollywood matinée idol Tyrone Power and actress Linda Christian. In 1975, with then-husband, Italian tenor Albano Carrisi, she founded one of the most iconic musical duets in history, Al Bano & Romina Power.

Biography

Childhood
Power is the eldest daughter of American screen idol Tyrone Power and his second wife, Mexican actress Linda Christian. She was named after Rome, where her parents had fallen in love; her middle name is in reference to the church of Santa Francesca Romana, the site of their wedding ceremony.

Initially, she grew up in the Bel Air neighborhood of Los Angeles. After her parents divorced in 1956, Power and her younger sister Taryn were sent to live with their maternal grandmother in Mexico. They went to live briefly with their mother and her new husband, Edmund Purdom, but were later sent to boarding schools in England, Switzerland, and Italy. Among the schools Power attended was Cobham Hall School in Kent, England. Later, both Power and her mother lived in a penthouse in the Roman quartiere of Parioli.

Acting career
Power began trying out for film roles at age 12. She made her screen debut at age 14 in the Italian film Menage all'italiana, starring alongside Ugo Tognazzi and Anna Moffo. Power subsequently appeared in several films, achieving notoriety for acting in roles that highlighted her sex appeal. In December 1966, her role in the film How I Learned to Love Women came under attack from the Italian public and government, as well as the Catholic Church. Ludovico Montini, brother of Pope Paul VI, and other Christian Democratic senators charged that Power was forced to rehearse "lewd scenes for the film countless times." The Vatican newspaper, L'Osservatore Romano, called the film's moral content dubious and opined that minors should have been banned from viewing it. In 1969, her starring role in the film Marquis de Sade: Justine resulted in its banning in Italy and in the seizure of all prints.

In an interview Power gave in 1966, she said that despite her typecasting she did not regard herself as a "Lolita." In a later interview in 1970, Power expressed regret for having let her mother choose sexually suggestive film roles for her.

In 1983, Power declined the role of Deborah in Once Upon a Time in America, which had been privately offered to her by the director Sergio Leone.

Musical fame

Power's interest in music was awakened in her childhood by American musicals from the 1950s, Mexican Mariachi bands, and Italian music from the 1960s. In her early teens, Power discovered The Beatles and Bob Dylan, which inspired her to compose music. After receiving a guitar as a birthday gift, she learned chords and wrote her first songs.

In 1975, Power and her husband Albano "Al Bano" Carrisi founded the singing duo Al Bano and Romina Power, which became a sensation in Continental Europe and Latin America. They released multiple albums in different languages and achieved 7th place for Italy in both the 1976 and 1985 Eurovision Song Contests. Their biggest hits included "Felicità", "Sharazan", and "Ci sarà". In 1989, after the overthrow of Nicolae Ceausescu, their song "Libertà" was played on Romanian national radio. Power was considered a sex symbol during the height of her career. Sir Terry Wogan of the BBC confessed that at the 1985 Eurovision Song Contest, he allocated points to Italy based on Power's sex appeal.

Later years

In 2005, Power was a judge in the Italian TV show Ballando con le Stelle. Between 2006 and 2007, she organized exhibitions of her paintings, mainly in Milan. At the same time she dedicated herself to directing her film Upaya.

In 2007, Power moved back to the United States, buying a house in Sedona, Arizona. According to an interview she gave to the Italian press at the time, she felt to be perceived by the Italian public merely as a performer of "Il ballo del qua-qua" (a song for children), and that she found it difficult to establish herself in Italy as a painter and writer. Power also stated that she was disturbed by the intrusive attention of the local press, which published multiple articles speculating about her private life and the disappearance of her daughter Ylenia.

Shortly after Power's relocation in 2008, her mother Linda Christian was diagnosed with colon cancer. Power went to live in her mother's house in Palm Springs, where she remained until her mother's death on July 22, 2011. In a November 2009 interview she gave to Italian TV she stated she had considered, at least for some time, a possible return to Italy. 

In the fall of 2012 her album Da lontano was released, containing songs written in 1999. In the summer of 2013, Power and Carrisi reunited for a concert performance in Moscow. In 2015 they reunited again for a guest appearance at the Sanremo Festival.

Personal life
Stanislas "Stash" Klossowski de Rola, the eldest son of the painter Balthus, proposed marriage to Power when she was 15. She accepted and her mother approved, provided that he wait until Power turned 18 and was allowed to develop artistically first. Klossowski de Rola introduced Power to Paul McCartney, Jane Asher, and Syd Barret, with whom she later became friends. The couple later postponed their wedding indefinitely.

In 1969, Power announced her engagement to Albano Carrisi. Upon their engagement, Carrisi persuaded Power to refrain from accepting any more risqué film roles and restricted the presence of her mother on set. They married on July 26, 1970.

Power and Carrisi separated in 1999. Their divorce was finalized in 2012. They have four children:
 Ylenia Maria Sole (born November 29, 1970), their eldest daughter who went missing in New Orleans, Louisiana in January 1994 (declared dead in absentia in 2014).
 Yari Marco Carrisi (born April 21, 1973)
 Cristèl Chiara Carrisi (born December 25, 1985), who appeared in Italian reality TV show La Fattoria 2 (The Farm).
 Romina Yolanda Carrisi (born June 1, 1987), who appeared in the 2005 edition of Italian reality TV show Isola dei Famosi (a version of Survivor) with her father.

Power is a polyglot who speaks five languages: English, Italian, Spanish, French and Dutch. She is a follower of Tibetan Buddhism.

Filmography

Films

Television

Discography

Solo
 12 canzoni e una poesia (1969)
 Ascolta, ti racconto di un amore (1974)
 Con un paio di Blue-Jeans (1974)
 Da lontano (2012)

With Al Bano
 Atto I (1975)
 1978 (1978)
 Aria pura (1979)
 Sharazan (1981) (Spanish)
 Felicità (1982)
 Felicidad (1982) (Spanish)
 Che angelo sei (1982)
 Que ángel será (1983) (Spanish)
 Ci sará (1984) 
 The Golden Orpheus Festival 1984 (1984)
 Effetto amore (1984)
 Sempre sempre (1986)
 Siempre siempre (1986) (Spanish)
 Libertà! (1987)
 Libertad (1987) (Spanish)
 Fragile (1988)
 Fragile (1988) (Spanish)
 Fotografia di un momento (1990)
 Fotografía de un momento (1990) (Spanish)
 Weihnachten bei uns zu Hause (1990) (also known as Corriere di Natale)
 Navidad ha llegado (1991) (Spanish)
 Vincerai (1991)
 Vencerás (1991) (Spanish)
 Notte e giorno (1993)
 El tiempo de amarse (1993) (Spanish)
 Emozionale (1995)
 Amor sagrado (1995) (Spanish)
 Ancora... Zugabe (1996)
 The Very Best – Live aus Verona (2015)

Bibliography
 Al Bano & Romina Power:  (Rizzoli, 1989)
 Cercando mio padre (Gremese, 1998)
 Ho sognato Don Chisciotte (Bompiani, 2000)
 Kalifornia (It's Here Now) (Arcana, 2004)
 Upaya (Fazi Editore, 2005)
 Ti prendo per mano (Mondadori, 2015)
 Karma Express (Mondadori, 2017)

References

External links

 Romina Power – Official site (bilingual)
 Official YouTube Channel
 
 

Actresses from Los Angeles
American expatriates in Italy
American women singers
American film actresses
American people of Dutch descent
American people of English descent
American people of French descent
American people of French-Canadian descent
American people of German descent
American people of Irish descent
American musicians of Mexican descent
American people of Spanish descent
American socialites
American television actresses
American women film producers
Eurovision Song Contest entrants for Italy
Eurovision Song Contest entrants of 1976
Eurovision Song Contest entrants of 1985
Film producers from California
French-language singers of the United States
Hispanic and Latino American actresses
People educated at Cobham Hall School
Power family
Sanremo Music Festival winners
Singers from Los Angeles
Spanish-language singers of the United States
Living people
21st-century American women
American actresses of Mexican descent
American Buddhists
1951 births